Sarah Nicklin is an American stage, film and television actress. Her career is strongly focused on independent films and she is known for her girl next door quality, strong emotional range, and ability to transform into dark damaged characters. Her first notable film role was as Sister Kelley Wrath in the independent cult-hit Nun of That in 2008. Since then she has won Best Actress for her role of Laura in Exhumed and Sarah in Victimized. She appeared in the film Escape The Dark and The Body of Levi, both which won Best Ensemble Cast.  She has also starred in the cult hit Atomic Brain Invasion. She also played the leading role of Sarah Burke in the horror-suspense thriller Abandoned Dead.

Early life and education 
Nicklin was born in Danbury, Connecticut where she spent many hours playing imaginary games in the wildlife preserve behind her house. She started acting due to a school-girl crush on child star Jonathan Taylor Thomas. At an early age, Nicklin was convinced that they were star-crossed lovers and was determined to become a successful actress in order to meet him. Even though she was terribly shy as a child, she appeared in her first play "Bye, Bye Birdie" in 6th grade.

Her family moved to Ridgefield, Connecticut just before she started high school where she continued to appear in school plays and participated in theater showcases and slam poetry readings. She was also an accomplished soccer player playing in the international Gothia Cup in Sweden at age 17 and was the first female pole vaulter at her high school, winning many county championships. She appeared on-camera for the first time in a short film La Bolsa directly out of high school. She took a year off from school and worked as a bank teller at Fairfield County Bank before attending Emerson College. Nicklin graduated Emerson College a semester early, cum laude, and with a BA in Theater, a BA in Marketing, and minor in psychology.

Filmography 

2007: Brotherhood
2008: Nun of That
2009: Across Dot Ave.
2010: Phillip the Fossil (official select of South by Southwest)
2010: Atomic Brain Invasion
2011: Exhumed
2012: Salinger Spies
2013: Normal
2013: Missing William
2014: The Haunting of Alice D
2014: Victimized
2015: Abandoned Dead
2016: The Bold and the Beautiful
2016: Unusual Suspects
2016: Anthrax - Blood Eagle Wings
2017: Ugly Christmas Sweater by Lifetime (TV network)
2018: Bath Bomb by Crypt TV
2019: American Exit release by Lionsgate/Grindstone
2020: Every Time You Leave music video by I Prevail
2021: Pretty Boy
2021: The Retaliators by Better Noise Music

Awards 

2010: Massachusetts Independent Film Festival, Best Actress Nomination, Choices
2012: Buffalo Screams Horror Film Festival, Best Actress, Exhumed
2013: Terror Film Festival, Best Actress, Debeaked
2014: ZedFest Film Festival, Outstanding Acting Performance, Victimized
2017: Studio City Film Festival, Best Ensemble Cast, Escape The Dark
2021: NYC Chain Film Festival, Best Ensemble Cast, The Body of Levi
2021: Macabre Faire Film Festival, Best Supporting Actress Nomination, Angel City Horror

References

External links 
 
 Official Website

Actresses from Connecticut
American stage actresses
American film actresses
Emerson College alumni
Actresses from Los Angeles
Living people
People from Danbury, Connecticut
21st-century American actresses
Year of birth missing (living people)